Amadjuak is a former Inuit settlement on southern Baffin Island in the Canadian territory of Nunavut.

History
The Hudson's Bay Company opened a trading post, #B380, at Amadjuak in 1921 and it remained in operation through 1933.

Notable residents
The artist, Ningeeuga Oshuitoq, was born at Amadjuak Camp in 1918.

References

External links
 Photo, 1920s

Baffin Island
Hudson's Bay Company trading posts in Nunavut
Ghost towns in Nunavut
Former populated places in the Qikiqtaaluk Region